The Antimena chameleon (Furcifer antimena) is a species of chameleon that is endemic to southwest Madagascar. It was initially described by French naturalist Alfred Grandidier in 1872.

Distribution and habitat 
Furcifer antimena was ranked as a Vulnerable species by the International Union for Conservation of Nature (IUCN) because it is found in an area where there is massive clearing of the forest for agriculture and charcoal production and because the population is believed to be declining.

Description 
The males are green with yellow and/or whitish stripes, and females are fully dark green. There is a projection on the tip of the snout which is larger in males than in females.

Biology 
Furcifer antimena typically lives among thorny scrub in dry savannah locations. The female lays a clutch of between ten and fifteen eggs in a concealed position, burying them in sandy soil. The young hatch out about a year later.

Taxonomy 
Furcifer antimena was first described in 1872 by French naturalist and explorer Alfred Grandidier. It is commonly known as the Antimena chameleon after the name of the species. There are several synonyms: Chamaeleo antimena (Grandidier, 1872), Chamaeleon rhinoceratus lineatus (Methuen & Hewitt, 1913), and Furcifer antimena (Glaw & Vences, 1944).

References 

antimena
chameleon
chameleon
Vulnerable biota of Africa
Reptiles described in 1872
Taxa named by Alfred Grandidier